Egypt and Serbia maintain diplomatic relations established between the Khedivate of Egypt and the Kingdom of Serbia in 1908. Egypt has an embassy in Belgrade, while Serbia has an embassy in Cairo, headed by Jugoslav Vukadinovic, Ambassador Extraordinary and Plenipotentiary.

Both countries were part of the Ottoman Empire.

See also 
 Foreign relations of Egypt 
 Foreign relations of Serbia
 Egypt–Yugoslavia relations
 Yugoslavia and the Non-Aligned Movement
 Yugoslavia and the Organisation of African Unity

Further reading

External links 
 Serbian Ministry of Foreign Affairs about relations with Egypt
 Serbian Ministry of Foreign Affairs: direction of the Egypt embassy in Belgrade
 Serbian Ministry of Foreign Affairs: direction of the Serbian embassy in Cairo